Farid Yusifli (born 20 February 2002) is an Azerbaijani footballer who plays as a midfielder for Neftçi Baku in the Azerbaijan Premier League.

Club career
On 20 August 2020, Yusifli made his debut in the Azerbaijan Premier League for Neftçi Baku match against Qarabağ.

References

External links
 

2002 births
Living people
Association football midfielders
Azerbaijani footballers
Azerbaijan youth international footballers
Azerbaijan Premier League players
Neftçi PFK players